Lacey Nicole Sturm (née Mosley, previously Carder; born September 4, 1981) is an American singer and songwriter born in Homestead, Florida, but raised in Arlington, Texas. She is a co-founder and lead vocalist of the hard rock band Flyleaf. In February 2016, Sturm became the first solo female artist to top the Billboard Hard Rock Albums chart with her debut release Life Screams.

Personal life 

Sturm is of English, Swedish, Scottish, and Northern Irish descent and has five siblings. She was raised as an atheist prior to becoming a Christian. She had contemplated suicide and then ended up in a church where a man spoke to her what she believed to be words from God. In her book, she wrote that after her conversion, she experienced life and God like never before. With brand new eyes, she said she felt like God was saying, "Yes, I know you. I know all the things you have done. I am not shocked by any of it. Come close to me, my love, just like you are. I have already forgiven your past and future. And, if you let me, I will make you new. I will make you into all that I have planned for you. You are beautiful, my love."

On September 6, 2008, she married Joshua Sturm, the guitarist for the band Kairos, from Pittsburgh, Pennsylvania. The couple have three sons together.

Musical career

Flyleaf 

In 2000, Sturm began to play with drummer James Culpepper. The pair worked with guitarists Sameer Bhattacharya and Jared Hartmann. In 2002, Pat Seals, Flyleaf's current bassist, joined, forming a group named Passerby. Due to legal reasons, they renamed themselves Flyleaf in June 2004.

On October 22, 2012, shortly before the release of New Horizons, Sturm revealed that she had amicably left Flyleaf. The album was nominated for the 2012 Rock Album of the Year Dove Award.

In an interview promoting her book The Reason: How I Discovered a Life Worth Living, Sturm explained that a primary reason for her leaving the band was the death of the band's sound engineer. The band performed one last show as a means to help the sound engineer's wife and child. This experience caused Sturm to consider her own son and wonder what she would do if she knew she had only one more year with him. "It was really amazing to recognize this season changing in my life and the freedom that I was gonna be able to focus on my family," Sturm said. "And although it was really hard, I'm thankful. And that's the reason I stepped down from Flyleaf."

On November 7, 2022, it was announced by Flyleaf that Sturm had returned to the band, with the band now calling themselves "Flyleaf with Lacey Sturm".

Guest appearances 

Sturm provided backing vocals on "Run to You" and "Born Again," two tracks on Christian rock band Third Day's 2008 album Revelation. She received two Grammy nominations at the 52nd Grammy Awards for her work with Third Day: "Born Again" was nominated for Best Gospel Song and Best Gospel Performance.

She has also worked with Apocalyptica on their song "Broken Pieces" and with Orianthi on the song "Courage."

She recorded a song, "Heavy Prey," for the Underworld: Awakening soundtrack.

She was a guest vocalist on the 2013 track "Take the Bullets Away" by We as Human.

In 2020, she performed as a guest vocalist in Breaking Benjamin's song "Dear Agony (Aurora Version)."

In 2021, she performed as a guest vocalist on Love and Death's cover of DJ Snake and Justin Bieber's song "Let Me Love You" on the album Perfectly Preserved.

Solo 

On October 13, 2014, Lacey announced via social media that she had a new band that was being put together. "[We're working on a] solo project and we are calling it Lacey. The brilliant drummer Tom Gascon, amazing bassist Ben Hull, my husband Josh Sturm who's an awesome guitarist and I have written some of my favorite heavy rock songs ever. And we will be rocking them for you tomorrow night! I can't wait!" The band premiered October 2014 at The Blind Tiger in Greensboro, North Carolina.

Her debut solo album, Life Screams, was released in 2016 opening at No. 74 on the Billboard 200, topping the Billboard Hard Rock Albums chart, No. 7 on Alternative Albums and No. 8 on Top Rock Albums. In 2017, Sturm toured with American hard rock band Letters from the Fire.

In March and April 2018, Sturm toured with Red, Righteous Vendetta and Messer.

Sturm released the single "The Decree" from her upcoming album in May 2020. The song was written with Skillet's Korey Cooper.

Other work 

Sturm has a role in the Billy Graham Evangelistic Association's worldwide video, The Cross, released in November 2013. Lecrae and Sturm shared the video in honor of Graham's 95th birthday. She sings the final song: "Mercy Tree". An accompanying album, My Hope, on which Sturm has two songs, "The Reason" and "Mercy Tree" was released.

Sturm has previously been involved with Hot Topic, modeling for their clothing line LOVEsick.

She was also featured as a solo performer in Franklin Graham's "Rock the Lakes", "Rock the Range", and "Rock the River" evangelistic tours throughout mid-August and late September 2011 where she gave her testimony and sang two songs – a self-written song entitled "The Reason", and an acoustic version of "Born Again" by Third Day. Sturm performed at most "Rock the Lakes" and "Rock the River" events again in 2012.

Shortly after giving birth to her second son in August 2013, Sturm embarked on a nationwide speaking tour with Nick Hall of PULSE, a Twin Cities-based nonprofit organization. The ResetMovement is described on their website as empowering a generation to live fully for Jesus.

The Whosoevers 

The Whosoevers is a movement fueled by what the founders see as an overwhelming need to encourage individuals and speak purpose into the lives of millions around the world. The nonprofit organization was founded in 2009 as a collaboration between Sonny Sandoval, Ryan Ries and Brian "Head" Welch with the intent to positively impact today's music, skateboarding and art culture. Ambassadors include Sturm, Annie Lobert, freestyle motocross athlete Ronnie Faisst, and lead singer of the band Islander Mikey Carvajal.

Books 

In September 2014 Sturm published her first book, an autobiography, titled The Reason: How I Discovered a Life Worth Living.

It was announced in March 2016 that her second book titled The Mystery: Finding Love in a World of Broken Lovers would be available in October 2016.

Film 

It was announced in July 2019 that a collaboration with Michael Kadrie would begin to write a screenplay for a feature film based on Sturm's book The Reason: How I Discovered a Life Worth Living.

Discography

With Flyleaf 

 Flyleaf (2005)
 Memento Mori (2009)
 New Horizons (2012)

Solo albums

With Josh Sturm

Solo singles

Music videos 

 "Rot" (2016)
 "The Soldier" (2018)
 "The Return" (2019)
 "State of Me" (2021)
 "Awaken Love" (2021)

Guest appearances 

 "Blank Pages" – Resident Hero (The Feeling Before Impact)
 "Youth of the Nation" – P.O.D. (Satellite) (Live MTV New Year's Eve 2007)
 "Alive" – P.O.D. (Satellite) (Live MTV New Year's Eve 2007)
 "Lights Out" – P.O.D. (Testify) (Live MTV New Year's Eve 2007)
 "Vendetta Black" – Resident Hero (The White EP, Look)
 "Time Is Nothing" – Resident Hero (Look)
 "Born Again" and "Run to You" – Third Day (Revelation)
 "The Nearness" – David Crowder Band (Church Music)
 "Courage" – Orianthi (Believe II)
 "Broken Pieces" – Apocalyptica (7th Symphony)
 "Heavy Prey" – Geno Lenardo (Underworld: Awakening (Original Motion Picture Soundtrack))
 "Take the Bullets Away" – We as Human (We as Human)
 "Breaking Free" – Skillet (Unleashed Beyond)
 "Dear Agony" – Breaking Benjamin (Aurora)
 "Let Me Love You" – Love and Death (Perfectly Preserved)
 "It's Not Easy Being Human" – Islander (It's Not Easy Being Human)
 "Hold On" – All Good Things (Hold On EP)

Bibliography 

 The Reason: How I Discovered a Life Worth Living (October 7, 2014) Baker Books
 The Mystery: Finding Love in a World of Broken Lovers (October 4, 2016) Baker Books
 The Return: Reflections On Loving God Back (May 22, 2018) Baker Books

References 

Living people
1981 births
21st-century American singers
21st-century Christians
American performers of Christian music
American women heavy metal singers
American women rock singers
Converts to Protestantism from atheism or agnosticism
Women post-grunge singers
Flyleaf (band)
Nu metal singers
People from Arlington, Texas
Singers from Texas
People from Homestead, Florida
21st-century American women singers